Ailsa Jane Hall  is a British researcher who is Director of the Sea Mammal Research Unit at the University of St Andrews. Her research considers the impact of contaminants on the risk of mortality in marine mammals.

Early life and education 
In 1985, Hall joined the University of Birmingham Institute of Occupational Health. Her early research considered the microbial health risks of post mortem technicians. This work, which informed the Code of Practise for the Department of Health and Social Care, formed the basis of her doctoral research.

Research and career 
In 1989, Hall joined the Sea Mammal Research Unit. At the time, the Unit was based in Cambridge, and Hall joined as an epidemiologist. She investigated an outbreak of phocine distemper amongst harbour seals. She moved to the University of St Andrews in 1996, where she worked on the immune response of seals. She showed that polychlorinated biphenyl contributed to the mortality of harbour seals in the North Sea. Whilst PCBs were banned in the late 1970s due to toxicity, they continue to be in circulation, and are able to resist extreme heat.

Hall investigates the impact of pathogens and contaminants on the health of marine mammals. She is interested in how contaminants and pathogens impact the early survival of animals. Hall focussed her efforts on improving biodiversity in the ocean. She studied the impact of climate change on populations of humpback whales, showing a significant drop in breeding successes in the wild.

Hall was appointed Officer of the Order of the British Empire (OBE) in the 2022 New Year Honours for services to environmental protection and epidemiology.

Selected publications

References 

Alumni of the University of Birmingham
Academics of the University of St Andrews
British women epidemiologists
Officers of the Order of the British Empire
Living people

Year of birth missing (living people)